The Nitty Gritty Dirt Band (NGDB) is an American country rock band from Long Beach, California. Formed in October 1965, the group was originally a jug band featuring guitarist and vocalist Jeff Hanna, guitarists Bruce Kunkel, Ralph Barr and Dave Hanna, bassist and guitarist Les Thompson, and drummer Glen Grosclose. The current lineup of the band features Jeff Hanna, Jimmie Fadden on drums, harmonica and vocals (since 1966), Bob Carpenter on keyboards and vocals (since 1979), Jim Photoglo on bass and guitar (since 2005), Jaime Hanna on guitar and vocals, and Ross Holmes on mandolin and fiddle (both since 2018).

History

1965–1982
The NGDB evolved from the Illegitimate Jug Band in late 1965, with the original lineup featuring Jeff Hanna, Bruce Kunkel, Ralph Barr, Les Thompson, Dave Hanna and Glen Grosclose. By February 1966, Dave Hanna and Grosclose had left, with their places taken by Jackson Browne and Jimmie Fadden. Browne remained only until July, when he left to start a solo career. He was replaced the following month by John McEuen, who played banjo, mandolin, guitar and fiddle. After the release of The Nitty Gritty Dirt Band and Ricochet, Kunkel left the NGDB in December 1967 and was replaced by Chris Darrow, formerly of Kaleidoscope. Darrow contributed to the studio album Rare Junk and the live release Alive!, before the band went on hiatus at the end of 1968.

Six months later, the band returned with Jimmy Ibbotson in place of Darrow. Three albums followed – Uncle Charlie & His Dog Teddy, All the Good Times and Will the Circle Be Unbroken – before the group was reduced to a quartet when Thompson departed in late 1973. By mid-1976, Ibbotson had also left and new members John Cable (guitar, bass, vocals) and Jackie Clark (bass, guitar, keyboards) had joined the group, whose name had been shortened to simply the Dirt Band. Around a month after returning home following a string of shows in the Soviet Union, Clark left the Dirt Band and Cable was dismissed by Hanna. Hanna, Fadden and McEuen then rebuilt the band with the addition of bassist Richard Hathaway, saxophonist Al Garth and drummer Merel Bregante.

The Dirt Band went through a succession of drummers during its tenure – by the summer of 1979, Bregante had been replaced by Mike Buono, former Jimmy Buffett drummer Michael Gardner took over from Buono in May 1980, and the following year saw Vic Mastrianni take over the position. After contributing to The Dirt Band and An American Dream as a guest session contributor, keyboardist Bob Carpenter officially joined the group in 1979. Jealousy followed in 1981, after which Garth also left and was replaced briefly by Bryan Savage.

1982 onwards
By 1982, Jimmy Ibbotson had returned and the Dirt Band had reverted to its original name of the Nitty Gritty Dirt Band. As a five-piece, the group released four studio albums in four years, before McEuen left in January 1987 to focus on his family. He was replaced in March by former Eagles guitarist Bernie Leadon, although he only remained until the following July, when he left to focus on his solo career. The NGDB remained a four-piece for the following 13 years, before McEuen rejoined for a run of reunion shows starting in July 2001. The return of McEuen was later made official for a new album and resulting tours. After the tour for 2004's Welcome to Woody Creek, the group returned to a four-piece again when Ibbotson left for a second time.

In May 2016, Jim Photoglo joined the NGDB in time for the group's 50th anniversary tour. McEuen left for a second time in October 2017, claiming an "ongoing difference of opinions" with other members. For tour dates the following year, the remaining four members were joined by Hanna's son Jaime on guitar and vocals, and Ross Holmes on fiddle, mandolin and vocals.

Members

Current

Former

Timeline

Lineups

References

External links
Nitty Gritty Dirt Band official website

Nitty Gritty Dirt Band